Patiala Aviation Club Workers Union is a trade union organising workers at the Patiala Aviation Club in Patiala, Punjab, India. PACWU is affiliated to the All India Trade Union Congress. The president of PACWU is Balinder Kumar Sharma. In the period of 1999-2001 PAC workers were not paid salaries for over two years, something that was highlighted by the PACWU.

Trade unions in India
All India Trade Union Congress
Organisations based in Patiala
Aviation trade unions
Transport trade unions in India
Organizations with year of establishment missing